Alpine Loop may refer to:

 The Alpine Loop National Back Country Byway in Colorado
 The Alpine Loop Scenic Byway in Utah